Nu Aquilae, Latinized from ν Aquilae, is the Bayer designation for a double star in the constellation of Aquila that lies close to the celestial equator. It has an apparent visual magnitude of 4.72 and so is visible to the naked eye. The variable star NU Aquilae has a similar-looking designation but is a separate and unrelated object.

The spectrum of ν Aql A matches a stellar classification of F3, with the luminosity class of Ib indicating this is a supergiant. This is a massive star, with approximately 12.5 times the mass of the sun, and it spans ~71 times the Sun's girth. It is only 15 million years old and is radiating around 7,600 times the luminosity of the Sun. The outer atmosphere has an effective temperature of 6,700 K and it has the yellow-white hue of an F-type star.

ν Aql B is a ninth magnitude star 201 arc-seconds distant. Little is known about it except an approximate spectral classification.

References

External links
 
 Image ν Aquilae
 HR 7387
 CCDM 19265+0021

F-type supergiants
A-type main-sequence stars
A-type subgiants
Double stars

Aquila (constellation)
J19460427+1145429
Aquilae, Nu
Durchmusterung objects
Aquilae, 32
182835
095585
7387